Lipsey is an unincorporated community in Coles County, Illinois, United States. Lipsey is located along Illinois Route 121 near the western border of Mattoon.

References

Unincorporated communities in Coles County, Illinois
Unincorporated communities in Illinois